Bolam is a surname. Notable people with the surname include:

Irene Craigmile Bolam, American banker
James Bolam, English actor
John Bolam, British artist
Ken Bolam, British film and television composer
Margaret Dale (dancer), born Margaret Elisabeth Bolam, British dancer
Silvester Bolam, British newspaper editor